The 2018–19 Ligue 1 season was Racing Club de Strasbourg Alsace's second season since its return to the top flight of French football.

Players

Current squad

Out on loan

Competitions

Ligue 1

League table

Results summary

Results by round

Matches

Coupe de France

Coupe de la Ligue

Statistics

Appearances and goals

|-
! colspan="12" style="background:#dcdcdc; text-align:center"| Goalkeepers

|-
! colspan="12" style="background:#dcdcdc; text-align:center"| Defenders

|-
! colspan="12" style="background:#dcdcdc; text-align:center"| Midfielders

|-
! colspan="12" style="background:#dcdcdc; text-align:center"| Forwards

|-
! colspan="12" style="background:#dcdcdc; text-align:center"| Players transferred out during the season
|-

References

RC Strasbourg Alsace seasons
Strasbourg